Charles Logan may refer to:

Charles Logan (author) (born 1930), British science fiction writer
Charles Logan (24 character), fictional character on the U.S. television series 24
Chuck Logan (author) (born 1942), American author of crime drama
Chuck Logan (American football) (born 1943), former American football tight end